Diaphoropeza is a genus of bristle flies in the family Tachinidae.

Species
Diaphoropeza braueri (Williston, 1896)
Diaphoropeza mayensis Townsend, 1929
Diaphoropeza peruana Townsend, 1911
Diaphoropeza peruviana Townsend, 1911

References

Tachinidae
Taxa named by Charles Henry Tyler Townsend